Doomadgee Airport  is an airport in Doomadgee, Queensland, Australia. The airport recently received $200,853 for security upgrades.

Airlines and destinations

See also
 List of airports in Queensland

References

North West Queensland
Airports in Queensland